Qualification for the 2007 FIBA European Championship, commonly called FIBA EuroBasket 2007 took place between 31 August 2006 and 16 September 2007. A total of seven teams qualified for the tournament. Hosts Spain plus the eight European teams that participated in the 2006 FIBA World Championship (France, Germany, Greece, Italy, Lithuania, Serbia, Slovenia and Turkey) qualified directly.

Format
National squads were divided in a two-tier system. Teams in Division A competed for direct qualification to FIBA EuroBasket 2007, while teams in Division B competed for two spots on the next tournament's Division A. Those two spots would correspond to the two teams from Division A that were relegated.

Division A
Teams were split into four groups of four teams each. The competition system was that of a double round-robin with home and away games where the winner from each group and the two best runners-up qualified to EuroBasket 2007.
The remaining teams where split into three double round-robin groups, two of three teams and one of four teams, and competed in an additional qualifying round. The winners from each group formed an additional round-robin group where the best team earned the last berth for EuroBasket 2007. The three bottom teams from the additional qualifying round competed in another round-robin group where the bottom-two teams were relegated to Division B for the following tournament.

Division B
Teams were split into two groups of four teams each, and one group of three teams. The competition system was that of a double round-robin with home and away games where the winner from each group plus the best runner-up where paired in two series of home-and-away games. The winner of each series (by overall point differential if the two-game series is a split) is promoted to Division A for the next tournament.

Division A

Qualifying round

Group 1

Rules=1) Points; 2) Head-to-head results; 3) Points difference; 4) Points scored.

Group 2

Rules=1) Points; 2) Head-to-head results; 3) Points difference; 4) Points scored.

Group 3

Group 4

Additional qualifying round

Group A

Rules=1) Points; 2) Head-to-head results; 3) Points difference; 4) Points scored.

Group B

Rules=1) Points; 2) Head-to-head results; 3) Points difference; 4) Points scored.

Group C

Rules=1) Points; 2) Head-to-head results; 3) Points difference; 4) Points scored.

Final qualifying stage

Times given below are in Central European Summer Time (UTC+2).

|}

Relegation stage

Times given below are in Central European Summer Time (UTC+2).

|}

Division B

Qualifying round

Group A

|}

Group B

|}

Group C

|}

Qualification games

References

qualification
2006–07 in European basketball
2007–08 in European basketball
2007